Sweden Party was a far-right political party in Sweden. It was founded in late 1986 through the merger of Bevara Sverige Svenskt and the Progress Party. The leader of the party was Stefan Herrmann, formerly the leader of the Progress Party.

In October 1987, Herrmann was expelled from the party. His group reconstituted the Progress Party. The remainder of the party would regroup as the Sweden Democrats in 1988.

References

Defunct political parties in Sweden
1986 establishments in Sweden
1988 disestablishments in Sweden
Political parties established in 1986
Political parties disestablished in 1988
Nationalist parties in Sweden